Arnaldo Manoel de Almeida (born 15 April 1992), simply known as Arnaldo, is a Brazilian footballer who plays as a right back for Mirassol.

Career
Born in Uberaba, Minas Gerais, Arnaldo moved to São Paulo at early age, after being spotted by a former player, Jorge Lima; he joined a youth setup in Bady Bassitt in 2010 before moving to Mirassol's youth squads in the summer. As a forward, he was converted to a right-back during the process.

On 17 April 2011 Arnaldo made his first-team debut, coming on as a second-half substitute of a 0–3 loss at Botafogo-SP, for the Paulistão championship. On 28 August 2012 he signed a new two-year deal with Leão.

After being loaned to Rio Branco at the start of the 2013 season, Arnaldo joined América-RN in May 2013, also on loan. He returned to Mirassol at the end of the year, and after impressing while on the club in 2014, he joined Portuguesa on 23 April 2014.

On 3 December, after appearing regularly for Lusa, Arnaldo moved to Penapolense, also in a temporary deal until May. On 15 April 2015 he joined Criciúma, on loan until the end of the year.

On 10 January 2019, Arnaldo was loaned out to Ponte Preta for the 2019 season from Botafogo.

Honours

Club
Botafogo
 Campeonato Carioca: 2018

Atlético Goianiense
 Campeonato Goiano: 2020

References

External links
 
 

1992 births
Living people
Sportspeople from Minas Gerais
Brazilian footballers
Association football defenders
Campeonato Brasileiro Série A players
Campeonato Brasileiro Série B players
Campeonato Brasileiro Série D players
Mirassol Futebol Clube players
Rio Branco Esporte Clube players
América Futebol Clube (RN) players
Associação Portuguesa de Desportos players
Clube Atlético Penapolense players
Criciúma Esporte Clube players
Joinville Esporte Clube players
Grêmio Novorizontino players
Ituano FC players
Botafogo de Futebol e Regatas players
Ceará Sporting Club players
Associação Atlética Ponte Preta players
Avaí FC players
Atlético Clube Goianiense players
Operário Ferroviário Esporte Clube players